Capitol Wrestling Corporation Ltd. was an American sports promotion company. It was run by Vincent J. McMahon from 1953 to 1982. Operating as the Capitol Wrestling Corporation (CWC), the company was originally a professional wrestling and boxing promotion and later became the sanctioning body for the World Wide Wrestling Federation (WWWF) and the World Wrestling Federation (WWF).  The Capitol Wrestling Corporation is the precursor to today's WWE, as of 2023 run by Nick Khan as CEO and majority owned by McMahon's son, Vincent K. McMahon.

History

Early history (1953–1963)

Jess McMahon was a successful boxing promoter who began working with Tex Rickard in 1926. With the help of Rickard, he began promoting boxing 
at the third Madison Square Garden. A few years prior, professional wrestler Toots Mondt had created a new challenge of professional wrestling that he called “Slam Bang Western Style Wrestling”. He convinced wrestler Ed Lewis and his manager Billy Sandow to implement this new solution and wrestlers to sign contracts with their Gold Dust Trio. After much success, a disagreement over power caused the trio to dissolve and, with it, their promotion. Mondt later formed partnerships with several other promoters, including Jack Curley in New York City. Curley's ill health led to Mondt, aided by McMahon and others, taking over the New York wrestling scene.

On January 7, 1953 the first show under the Capitol Wrestling Corporation (CWC) was produced. It is not certain who the founder of the CWC was. Some sources state that it was Jess' son Vincent J. McMahon while other sources credit Jess himself as the founder of CWC. The CWC later joined the National Wrestling Alliance (NWA) and famous New York-Promoter Toots Mondt soon joined the CWC. 
Together they were very successful and soon controlled approximately 70% of the NWA's booking, largely due to their dominance in the heavily populated Northeastern United States.

World Wide Wrestling Federation (1963–1979)
In early 1963, Capitol formed the World Wide Wrestling Federation (WWWF), the precursor to current-day WWE, following a dispute with the NWA over Buddy Rogers being booked to hold the NWA World Heavyweight Championship. McMahon and Mondt awarded him the new WWWF World Heavyweight Championship that April. He lost it to Bruno Sammartino on May 17.

The WWWF operated in a conservative manner compared to other pro wrestling territories; it ran its major arenas monthly rather than weekly or bi-weekly, usually featuring a babyface champion wrestling various heels in programs that consisted of one to three matches. After gaining a television program deal and turning the well known tag team wrestler Lou Albano into a manager for Sammartino's heel opponents, the WWWF was doing sell out business by 1970.

Mondt left the company in the late 1960s and Vince McMahon, Sr. quietly rejoined the NWA in 1971.

Rebranding and sale to Titan Sports (1979–1982)
By March 1979, for marketing purposes, the World Wide Wrestling Federation was renamed the World Wrestling Federation (WWF). That same year, Vincent J. McMahon's son, Vincent K. McMahon, founded Titan Sports, Inc., incorporated on February 21, 1980, originally in Massachusetts.

In 1982, Titan Sports Inc. acquired Capitol's operations, effectively relocating its headquarters to Greenwich, Connecticut. At the annual meeting of the NWA in 1983, the McMahons and WWF employee Jim Barnett all withdrew from the organization. In an attempt to make the WWF the premier wrestling promotion in the world, McMahon began an expansion that fundamentally changed the industry. By 1985, Titan moved to Stamford, Connecticut then establishing a new entity in 1987 in Delaware which later merged with the old company in 1988. Titan later changed its name to World Wrestling Federation Entertainment Inc. in 1999, and later World Wrestling Entertainment Inc. in 2002. Vincent J. McMahon would not live to see his company grow from a territorial promotion to a worldwide organization. He died from pancreatic cancer at 69 years old on May 24, 1984.

Legacy
In October 2020, WWE's NXT brand introduced a new home studio in Orlando within the WWE Performance Center training facility, dubbed the "Capitol Wrestling Center" in homage to CWC.

See also
List of independent wrestling promotions in the United States

References

American professional wrestling promotions
Entertainment companies based in New York City
American companies established in 1953
American companies disestablished in 1982
Entertainment companies disestablished in 1982
National Wrestling Alliance members
1953 establishments in New York (state)
Entertainment companies established in 1953
1982 disestablishments in New York (state)
1982 mergers and acquisitions
History of WWE